Julio César Camacho (born 9 May 1978) is a Venezuelan luger. He competed in the men's singles event at the 2002 Winter Olympics.

References

External links
 

1978 births
Living people
Venezuelan male lugers
Olympic lugers of Venezuela
Lugers at the 2002 Winter Olympics